Mount Rutherford is a mountain in Jasper National Park in Alberta, Canada. It is part of the Northern Front Ranges of the Canadian Rockies.

In 1954, the Geographic Board of Alberta named the  peak Mount Rutherford after Alberta's first premier, Alexander Cameron Rutherford. It is about 34 kilometres northwest of the town of Jasper.

See also
 Geography of Alberta

References

 The Alberta Gazette #2026, December 15, 1954.
 "A Gentleman of Strathcona - Alexander Cameron Rutherford", Douglas R. Babcock, 1989, The University of Calgary Press, 2500 University Drive NW, Calgary, Alberta, Canada,

External links
 Trip to Mount Rutherford, scrambles.ca

Two-thousanders of Alberta
Mountains of Jasper National Park